, better known by the stage name of , is a Japanese actress, voice actress, singer and narrator. She played Minami Asakura in Touch, Akane Tendo in Ranma ½, Satsuki Kusakabe in My Neighbor Totoro, Near in Death Note, Jean Roque Raltique in Nadia: The Secret of Blue Water,  Kikyō in Inuyasha and Patricia O'Sullivan of Mischievous Twins: The Tales of St. Clare's. She is also the dub actress for Jayma Mays in the American TV series Glee, as well as in The Smurfs film series.

Biography
Hidaka was born in the Kudan area of Chiyoda, Tokyo, Japan, where she attended Fujimi Elementary School. Her parents owned a Western-style clothing store named "Tailor Itō". She began her career as an idol star, but switched to voice acting, and was employed by the talent management firm 81 Produce. Hidaka used to use the kanji variant 日髙 (note that the second kanji is different). She switched to the current usage (日高) around 1995 when she found that it was written that way already on many things and after friends recommended the kanji with the lower stroke count. Her fans have given her the affectionate name "Nonko" (ノン子). In 1982, during her time as an idol star, Hidaka appeared in the commercial for Nivea skin milk. She has also done voice-over commercials for programs and games, in which she plays a role for 3rd Super Robot Wars Alpha: To the End of the Galaxy.

Filmography

Anime television 
 Super Dimension Cavalry Southern Cross (1984, Musicaa (debut))
 Touch (1985–1987, Minami Asakura)
 City Hunter (1987–1988, Megumi)
 Tsuide ni Tonchinkan (1987–1988, Amago Shirai)
 Anime Sanjushi (1987–1989, Constance)
 City Hunter 2 (1988–1989, Mitsuko Shimizu)
 Patlabor (1989–1994, Prince Uru)
 Parasol Henbē (1989–1991, Megeru)
 The Adventures of Peter Pan (1989, Peter Pan)
 T.P. Pon (1989, Yumiko Yasugawa)
 Ranma ½ (1989–1992, Akane Tendo, Kanna)
 Nadia: The Secret of Blue Water (1990–1991, Jean Roque Raltique)
 Ochame na Futago: Kurea Gakuin Monogatari (1991, Patricia Sullivan)
 Honō no Tōkyūji: Dodge Danpei (1991–1992, Danpei Ichigeki)
 Miracle Girls (1993 Mikage Matsunaga (Mika Morgan))
 Aoki Densetsu Shoot! (1993–1994, Kazumi Endō)
 Akazukin Chacha (1994–1995, Shiine)
 Omakase Scrappers (1994–1995, Sayuri Tachibana)
 Soar High! Isami (1995–1996, Sōshi Yukimi)
 Harimogu Harley (1996–1997, Harley)
 Rurouni Kenshin (1996–1998, Seta Sōjirō)
 Bakusō Kyōdai Let's & Go!! MAX (1998, Retsuya Ichimonji)
 Pocket Monsters (1999, Kaoruko)
 Zoids: Guardian Force (1999–2000, Riize)
 Ojarumaru (1998-ongoing, Bispaniora-go)
 One Piece (1999-ongoing, Belle-Mère)
 Inuyasha (2000–2004, 2009–2010, Kikyō)
 Rockman EXE (2002–2003, Ms. Mariko Ōzono, Shuryou)
 Sonic X (2003–2004, Helen)
 Di Gi Charat Nyo! (2003–2004, Di Gi Charat's Mama)
 Rockman EXE AXESS (2003–2004, Ms. Mariko Ōzono, Yuriko Ōzono)
 Croket! (2003–2005, Anchovie)
 Rockman EXE Stream (2004–2005, Ms. Mariko Ōzono, Yuriko Ōzono)
 Samurai Champloo (2004–2005, Yatsuha)
 Major (2004, Chiaki Honda)
 Nanami-chan (2004, Yōko Aoba)
 The Snow Queen (2005–2006, Nina)
 Death Note (2007, Near)
 Chi's Sweet Home (2008–2009, Mom)
 Star Driver (2010, Fujino Yō)
 Suite PreCure (2011–2012, Aphrodite)
 Pretty Rhythm Aurora Dream (2011–2012, Omi Harune / Bear-chi)
 Detective Conan (2012, Masumi Sera)
 Hunter × Hunter (second series) (2012, Shalnark)
 Psycho-Pass (2012, Dominator's voice)
 Love Live School Idol Project (Principal Minami / Kotori's mom)
 Wake Up, Girls! (2014–2018, Junko Tange)
 Seiyu's Life! (2015, Herself)
 Garo: Guren no Tsuki (2015–2016, Izumi Shikibu)
 Little Witch Academia (2017, Shiny Chariot / Professor Ursula)
 Pop Team Epic (2018, Pipimi (Episode 1-A))
 Shinya! Tensai Bakabon (2018, Bakabon's mother)
 Bermuda Triangle: Colorful Pastrale (2019, Arudi)
 Mix (2019, narrator)
 Symphogear XV (2019, Shem-Ha Mephorash)
 Oda Cinnamon Nobunaga (2020, Ichiko's mother)
 Keep Your Hands Off Eizouken! (2020, Tsubame's mother)
 Higurashi: When They Cry – Gou (2021, Eua)
 Jujutsu Kaisen (2021, Yuki Tsukumo)
 Komi Can't Communicate (2021–2022, narrator)

Sources:

Original video animations (OVAs) 
 Salamander (1988, Stephanie)
 Top wo Nerae! (1988, Noriko Takaya)
 Baoh (1989, Sumire)
 Blazing Transfer Student (1991, Yukari Takamura)
 Spirit of Wonder: Chaina-san no Yūutsu (1992, China)
 The Hakkenden (1993–1995, Shinbei Inue)
 Ranma ½ (1993–2008, Akane Tendō)
 Special Duty Combat Unit Shinesman (1996, Riko Hidaka / Shinesman Salmon Pink)
 Spirit of Wonder (2001, China)
 Sakura Wars: Ecole de Paris (2003, Erica Fontaine)
 Sakura Wars: Le Nouveau Paris (2003, Erica Fontaine)
 Little Witch Academia (2013, Shiny Chariot / Professor Ursula)

Sources:

Films 
 Touch: Sebangō no Nai Ace (1986, Minami Asakura)
 Touch 2: Sayonara no Okurimono (1986, Minami Asakura)
 Doraemon: Nobita and the Knights on Dinosaurs (1987, Low)
 Touch 3: Kimi ga Tōri Sugita Ato ni (1987, Minami Asakura)
 My Neighbor Totoro (1988, Satsuki Kusakabe)
 Nadia: The Motion Picture (1991, Jean Roque Raltique)
 Ranma ½: Big Trouble in Nekonron, China (1991, Akane Tendo)
 Ranma ½: Nihao, My Concubine (1992, Akane Tendo)
 Ranma ½: Super Indiscriminate Decisive Battle! Team Ranma vs. the Legendary Phoenix (1994, Akane Tendo)
 Hunter × Hunter (1998, Kurapika)
 Touch: Miss Lonely Yesterday (1998, Minami Asakura)
 Touch: Cross Road (2001, Minami Asakura)
 Inuyasha the Movie: Affections Touching Across Time (2001, Kikyo)
 Inuyasha the Movie: The Castle Beyond the Looking Glass (2002, Kikyo)
 Pokémon: Destiny Deoxys (2004, Tory Lund)
 Inuyasha the Movie: Fire on the Mystic Island (2004, Kikyo)
 Pokémon: Lucario and the Mystery of Mew (2005, Mother)
 Gunbuster vs. Diebuster (2006, Noriko Takaya)
 Detective Conan: Dimensional Sniper (2014, Masumi Sera)
 Psycho-Pass: The Movie (2015, Dominator's voice)
 Love Live! The School Idol Movie - Principal Minami/Kotori's mom
 Little Witch Academia: The Enchanted Parade (2015, Professor Ursula)
 Detective Conan: The Scarlet Bullet (2021, Masumi Sera)
Sources:

Dubbing roles

Live-action
Jayma Mays
Glee – Emma Pillsbury
The Smurfs – Grace Winslow
The Smurfs 2 – Grace Winslow
9-1-1 – Maddie Buckley Kendall (Jennifer Love Hewitt)
The Birdcage (2000 Fuji TV edition) – Barbara Keeley (Calista Flockhart)
Charlie and the Chocolate Factory (2008 NTV edition) – Augustus Gloop (Philip Wiegratz)
Clifford the Big Red Dog – Maggie Howard (Sienna Guillory)
Edge of Darkness – Emma Craven (Joanne Whalley)
Eighteen, Twenty-Nine – Yoo Hye-chan (Park Sun-young)
Elementary – Tara Parker (Sutton Foster)
Kingpin – Rebecca (Michele Matheson)
The Last of the Mohicans (2001 Fuji TV edition) – Cora Munro (Madeleine Stowe)
Link – Jane Chase (Elisabeth Shue)
Moms' Night Out – Allyson (Sarah Drew)
Monrak Transistor – Sadao (Siriyakorn Pukkavesh)
Night Watch (1999 Fuji TV edition) – Myra Tang (Irene Ng)
Shane (2016 Star Channel edition) – Marian Starrett (Jean Arthur)
Super Mario Bros. – Daisy (Samantha Mathis)
Weekend at Bernie's – Gwen Saunders (Catherine Mary Stewart)

Animation
 The Iron Giant – Annie Hughes
 Miffy the Movie – Mother Bunny
 The Oz Kids – Dot Hugson (Until episode 23 before changing by Sayuri Ikemoto)

Video games 
 Wonder Project J: Kikai no Shōnen Pīno (1994) (Pīno)
 Black Matrix (1998) (Domina)
 Yukiwari no Hana (1998) (Kaori Sakuragi)
 Inuyasha (2001) (Kikyō)
 Rumble Roses (2005) (Reiko Hinomoto / Rowdy Reiko)
 Rumble Roses XX (2006) (Reiko Hinomoto / Rowdy Reiko)
 Project X Zone (2012) (Erica Fontaine)
 Project X Zone 2 (2015) (Erica Fontaine)
 Root Letter (2016) (Aya Fumino)
 Little Witch Academia: Chamber of Time (2017) (Ursula Callistis / Shiny Chariot)
 Our World is Ended (2019) (Nichol Shorter)
 Final Fantasy VII Remake (2020) (Claudia Strife)
 Senjin Aleste (2021) (Wise-N)
 Super Monkey Ball Banana Mania (2021) (AiAi, MeeMee, Baby, YanYan)

Unknown date
 Aoi Shiro (Syouko)
 Croquette! 2: Yami no Bank to Ban Joō (Anchovie)
 Croquette! 3: Guranyū Ōkoku no Nazo (Anchovie)
 Croquette! Great: Jikū no Bōken-tachi (Anchovie)
 Croquette! DS: Tenkū no Yūsha-tachi (Anchovie, Sardine)
 Evil Zone (aka Eretzvaju) (Midori Himeno)
 Grandia (Feena)
 Minna no Golf Portable (Sagiri)
 Idol Janshi Suchie Pai (series) (Kotori Ninomiya)
 Neon Genesis Evangelion: Battle Orchestra (Noriko Takaya)
 Panther Bandit (Kasumi)
 Puyo Puyo CD (Panotti)
 Puyo Puyo CD Tsū (Panotti)
 Ranma ½ (Akane Tendo)
 Rurouni Kenshin: Enjō! Kyoto Rinne (Sojiro Seta)
 Sakura Wars (series) (Erica Fontaine)
 Super Robot Wars (series) (Noriko Takaya, Mina Likering, Lenii Ai, Makibi Hari)
 Tales of the World: Narikiri Dungeon 2 (Thanatos)
 Tengai Makyou III: Namida (Iyo)
 TwinBee RPG (Molte)
 Ultima: Kyōfu no Exodus (game character introduction voice)
 VitaminR (Board Chairman)
 Wonder Project J2: Koruro no Mori no Josette (Josette)
 Zoids vs. (Atorē Arcadia, Riize)

Sources:

TV shows

Regular appearances 
 Bakeruno Shōgakkō Hyūdoro-gumi
 Battle Fever J - Keiko Nakahara
 Cool Japan - Narrator
 Let's Go Young
 Minna Ikiteiru
 Ohayou Studio
 Shin Afternoon Show 1987
 Tamiya RC Car Gran Prix
 Zawa Zawa Mori no Ganko-chan
Ressha Sentai ToQger - Miiss Glitta/Empress of Darkness Glitta
Ressha Sentai ToQger the Movie: Galaxy Line S.O.S. Miiss Glitta
 Koe Girl! (2018) – Mari Kikuchi
 Kamen Rider Zero-One - Zatt

Guest appearances 
 Quiz Nattoku Rekishikan (xxxx)
 Run Run Asa 6-sei Jōhō (xxxx)
 Sumai no 110-ban (xxxx)
 Tochūgesha Junjō (xxxx)
Voice II (2021)

Radio 
 Asakura Minami no All Night Nippon - September 29, 2004
 Clair de Lune (Banana Fritters)
 Earth Conscious Dream
 Hidaka Noriko no Happy @
 Hidaka Noriko no Tokyo Wonder Jam: Uri! Uri! Urihō!
 KBS Kyoto Hyper Night
 Hidaka Noriko no Aromatic Night
 Hidaka Noriko no Hyper Night Getsuyōbi
 Hidaka Noriko no Hyper Night Kinyōbi
 Nisseki Doyō Omoshiro Radio
 Nonko to Nobita no Anime Scramble
 Nonko's Cheerful Mind "Urara"
 Saturday Tokimeki Station
 Shōfukutei Tsuruko no All Night Nippon

Theatrical roles 
 Play a Song
 Sakura Taisen Dinner Show (Erica Fontaine)
 Sakura Taisen Kayō Show (Erica Fontaine)
 The Star Spangled Girl

CDs

Albums 
 Breath of Air
 Hidaka Noriko Best
 Kazumi (as Kazumi Endō)
 Mega Babe
 Minami no Seishun
 Minamikaze ni Fukarete
 Nonko
 Otakara Song Book
 Paradise
 Personal
 Personal 2
 Ranma ½ Utagoyomi Heisei 3 Nendoban (as Akane Tendo, includes Yasashii, ii Ko ni Narenai (a.k.a. the "Baka Song"))
 Time Capsule
 Touch in Memory (as Minami Asakura)

Sources:

Singles 
 Anata ga Uchū ～By My Side～
 Ashita he no Tsubasa / Niji no Kanata
 Be Natural / Megami ga Kureta Ichibyō
 Watashi Datte (as Kazumi Endō)

Sources:

Books 
 Nonko

References

External links 
  
 
 

1962 births
Living people
Japanese women pop singers
Japanese idols
Japanese stage actresses
Japanese video game actresses
Japanese voice actresses
People from Chiyoda, Tokyo
Voice actresses from Tokyo
20th-century Japanese actresses
21st-century Japanese actresses
20th-century Japanese women singers
20th-century Japanese singers
21st-century Japanese women singers
21st-century Japanese singers
81 Produce voice actors